The Geography of Girlhood is a coming of age novel verse novel by Kirsten Smith, screenwriter and filmmaker.  Published by Little Brown in 2006, the novel chronicles Penny Morrow, fourteen-year-old with a missing mother, a wild older sister, a protective younger stepbrother and one severe crush on absolutely the wrong guy.

To make matters worse, Penny's trapped in a small town in the Pacific Northwest, where "nothing ever happens / and if it does / all the things with wings / fly away."

External links 
 Amazon entry

2006 American novels
American young adult novels
Little, Brown and Company books
Verse novels
American bildungsromans